Mount Lebanon Shaker Society, also known as New Lebanon Shaker Society, was a communal settlement of Shakers in New Lebanon, New York. The earliest converts began to "gather in" at that location in 1782 and built their first meetinghouse in 1785.  The early Shaker Ministry, including Joseph Meacham and Lucy Wright, the architects of Shakers' gender-balanced government, lived there.

Isaac N. Youngs, the society's scribe, chronicled the life of this Shaker village for almost half a century. Youngs also designed the schoolhouse built there in 1839.

Holy Mount, where Shaker services were held, has a spur ridge which has been called Mount Lebanon.

In addition to the Shakers' central Ministry, notable residents at Mount Lebanon's North Family included Elder Frederick W. Evans, known for his public preaching, and his partner, Eldress Antoinette Doolittle, who was succeeded by Anna White, M. Catherine Allen artists Sarah Bates, and Polly Anne Reed.

The North Family was also known for publishing a book of poetry, Mount Lebanon Cedar Boughs: original poems by the North family of Shakers, Anna White, ed. (Buffalo: Peter Paul Company, 1895), with a number of poems by Cecilia Devere and Martha Anderson.

Membership
In 1787, the Church Family (the First Order plus the Second Order) housed 57 male and 48 female Shakers, for a total of 105. 
In 1789, the Church Family's two orders housed 117 male and 116 female Shakers, for a total of 233.
Numbers fluctuated according to the state of the economy and the vigor of Shaker missionaries; hard times increased membership, but rarely did the numbers reach that high again. The total dropped to 130 in 1806, then gradually rose to 240 in 1843 (111 males and 129 females) in the Church Family. 
From that point, membership eroded further. In 1879, the Church Family housed only 54 male and 88 female Shakers, for a total of 142. The closing of smaller communities and consolidation into the larger villages postponed dissolution for several decades.

In the 1940s, due to aging members and declining membership, the Shakers sold the site to Darrow School. Throughout the subsequent years, the site has been managed by several different owners. Darrow owns what remains of the Church and Center Families, while Shaker Museum  Mount Lebanon manages preservation and operates tours of the North Family; the rest of the buildings of remaining Families are privately owned.

Buildings
Mount Lebanon's main building became a National Historic Landmark in 1965.

Although the first of the Shaker settlements in the U.S. was in the Watervliet Shaker Historic District, Mount Lebanon became the leading Shaker society, and was the first to have a building used exclusively for religious purposes. Benson Lossing documented that meetinghouse and a few other buildings when he visited the Shakers in 1856.

Mount Lebanon is located where Shaker Rd. merges with Darrow Rd. off US 20 in New Lebanon, New York. The North Family buildings are preserved as the Shaker Museum.

See also
 Shaker tilting chair
 Frederick William Evans

References

Further reading
Note: This Shaker site is notable for having preserved hundreds of diaries, account books, hymnals, and other manuscripts in collections now at Hancock Shaker Village, the Library of Congress, New York Public Library, New York State Library, Mount Lebanon, Western Reserve Historical Society, and the Winterthur Museum Library. Some of these primary sources have been published.

 Bishop, Rufus.  Elder Rufus Bishop’s Journals. 2 vols. Peter H. Van Demark, ed.  Clinton, N.Y.: Couper Press, 2018. 
 Paterwic, Stephen. "From Individual to Community: Becoming a Shaker at New Lebanon, 1780–1947." Communal Societies, Volume 11 (1991): 18–33.
 Visiting the Shakers, 1778-1849. Clinton, N.Y.: Couper Press/Hamilton College, 2007. 
 Visiting the Shakers, 1850-1899. Clinton, N.Y.: Couper Press/Hamilton College, 2010.
 Wergland, Glendyne R. One Shaker Life: Isaac Newton Youngs, 1793-1865. Amherst: University of Massachusetts Press, 2006.
 Wergland, Glendyne R. Sisters in the Faith: Shaker Women and Equality of the Sexes. Amherst: University of Massachusetts Press, 2011.
 Youngs, Isaac N. Isaac Newton Youngs’s Concise View of the Millennial Church. Clinton, N.Y.: Richard W. Couper Press, 2017.

External links

Mount Lebanon Shaker Society  website on Shaker Historic Trail, National Park Service.
A Shaker hymn in memory of President Abraham Lincoln
Shaker Music History
Photos at Historic American Buildings Survey:
Shaker Church Family Dwelling House (6 photos)
Shaker Museum|Mount Lebanon website for the North Family historic site's managing museum.
Video of an interview with Sarah Collins and Adelaide Wilson filmed in 1930.

 
U.S. Route 20